Ribot (and its variant La Ribot) is a surname. People with the surname include:

 Alexandre Ribot (1842–1923), four times Prime Minister of France
 Eulàlia Ferrer Ribot (1776-1850), Spanish printer
 Gemma Arró Ribot (born 1980), Catalan ski mountaineer
 Jean-Noël Ribot (born 1949), French rower
 John Ribot, Australian sports administrator and former rugby league international
 José María Vallés y Ribot (1849–1911), Catalan Spanish politician
 Marc Ribot (born 1954), American guitarist and composer
 María La Ribot (born 1962), Spanish dancer and choreographer
 Théodule Ribot (1823–1891), French realist painter
 Théodule-Armand Ribot (1839–1916), French psychologist
 Verónica Ribot (born 1962), Argentine diver

See also
 Ribot, disambiguation page

Surnames of French origin
Surnames of Catalan origin